VIC, Vic, or vic may refer to:

People and fictional characters 
 Vic (name), a list of people, fictional characters and mascots with the given name
 V.I.C. (rapper) (born 1987), stage name of an American rapper

Places
 Vic, a municipality in Barcelona Province, Spain
 Vič District, Ljubljana, Slovenia
 Vič, a former village, now part of Ljubljana
 Vič, Dravograd, a village in northern Slovenia
 Mount Vic, a mountain in British Columbia, Canada
 Several places in France: 
 Vic-sur-Aisne (02 Aisne)
 Vic-sur-Cère (15 Cantal) in south-central France
 Vic-de-Chassenay (21 Côte-d'Or)
 Vic-des-Prés (21 Côte-d'Or)
 Vic-sous-Thil (21 Côte-d'Or)
 Vic-le-Fesq (30 Gard)
 Vic-Fezensac (32 Gers) in south-western France
 Vic-la-Gardiole (34 Hérault) in southern France
 Vic-sur-Seille (57 Moselle) in north-eastern France
 Vic-le-Comte (63 Puy-de-Dôme)
 Vic-en-Bigorre (65 Hautes-Pyrénées) in south-western France
 Victoria (state), a state in Australia

Government and military
 Vic., abbreviation used when referring to Acts of Parliament in the United Kingdom, indicating an act during the reign of Victoria, e.g. 23 Vic
 vic(s), abbreviation used when referring to vehicle(s) of all kinds
 Vehicle Identity Check, a former car ownership regulation in the UK
 Veteran identification card, issued by the United States Department of Veterans Affairs
 Vic formation, a fighter formation first used in the First World War
 Victualling Inshore Craft, a type of Royal Navy auxiliary vessel during the Second World War

Science and technology
 Cisco virtual interface card, an adapter for Cisco servers that works with both storage area networks and general-purpose networks
 MOS Technology VIC, or Video Interface Chip from MOS Technology, or VIC chip, used in the VIC-20 home computer
 MOS Technology VIC-II, or VIC-II (Video Interface Chip II), the successor to the VIC chip, used in the Commodore C64 and C128 home computers
 VIC-20, an 8-bit home computer from Commodore
 Vicinal (chemistry), a compound geometry in chemistry
 VMware Infrastructure Client
 Voice interface card, a hardware interface in telecommunications and networking
 Voltage-gated ion channels, proteins that carry charged ions across cell membranes

Other uses
 VIC, ISO 639-3 code for Virgin Islands Creole, an English-based creole language
 VIC, National Rail code of London Victoria station
 Villagers of Ioannina City, a Greek folk rock band
 Interpretation centre or Visitor Interpretive Center, an institution for dissemination of knowledge of natural or cultural heritage
 Vadodara Innovation Council, a non-profit associated with National Innovation Council of India
 Vienna International Centre, the campus and building complex hosting the United Nations Office at Vienna
 Virginia Intermont College, a small private Baptist liberal arts college in Bristol, Virginia
 Visitor center or Visitor Information Center, a place that provides information to tourists or other visitors
 VIC cipher, a cipher used by Soviet spy Reino Häyhänen
 Vic (film), a 2006 short film directed by Sage Stallone
 The Vic Theatre, a music venue in Chicago, Illinois
 Vegas Vic, an unofficial name for a Las Vegas neon sign
 UE Vic, a Spanish football club based in Vic, Catalonia, Spain
 VIC (TV series), a Toggle Original drama series

See also

 Stalag VI-C, a World War II German POW camp near Oberlangen
 Vick (disambiguation)
 Victor (disambiguation)
 Victoria (disambiguation)
 Vik (disambiguation)